Henry Layng D.D. was an Anglican priest in the late 17th and early 18th centuries.

Lever was educated at Trinity College, Dublin. He was Archdeacon of Wilts from 1716 until his death in 1726.

Notes

17th-century English Anglican priests
18th-century English Anglican priests
Archdeacons of Wilts
Alumni of Trinity College Dublin
1726 deaths